Methanobrevibacter smithii is the predominant archaeon in the microbiota of the human gut. M. smithii has a coccobacillus shape. It plays an important role in the efficient digestion of polysaccharides (complex sugars) by consuming the end products of bacterial fermentation. Methanobrevibacter smithii is a single-celled microorganism from the Archaea domain. M. smithii is a methanogen, and a hydrogenotroph that recycles the hydrogen by combining it with carbon dioxide to methane. The removal of hydrogen by M. smithii is thought to allow an increase in the extraction of energy from nutrients by shifting bacterial fermentation to more oxidized end products.

Importance in the human gut

The human gut microbiota consists of three main groups of hydrogen-consuming microorganisms or hydrogenotrophs: methanogens including M. smithii; various acetogenic bacteria; and sulfate-reducing bacteria. The different roles of these microorganisms are helpful in understanding how hydrogen metabolism affects the efficiency of dietary fermentation. Accumulation of hydrogen in the gut reduces the efficiency of microbial fermentation as well as the yield of energy. Methanogenic archaea are therefore particularly significant for the human gut, because they are pivotal in the removal of excess hydrogen.  M. smithii is the most common methanogenic archaeon in the human gut microbiota. M. smithii is paramount in digestive processes, and has a high prevalence in human feces.

The gut microbiota is dominated by gram-negative Bacteroidota, and Bacillota (mostly gram-positive). Archaea are most prominently represented by the methanogenic M. smithii. M. smithii is believed to be a therapeutic target for manipulation and an adaptation to the gut ecosystem.

M. smithii has significant enrichment of genes involved in the utilization of carbon dioxide (CO2), hydrogen gas (H2), and formate (HCO2−) for methanogenesis. It also has an intact pathway to allow for CO2 utilization gene cluster for the methanogenic consumption of Bacteroides thetaiotaomicron-produced metabolite. 

M. smithii supports methanogenic and nonmethanogenic removal of diverse bacterial end products of fermentation.

The dominant archaeon in the human gut ecosystem affects the specificity and efficiency of bacterial digestion of dietary polysaccharides. This influences the person’s calorie harvest and body fat. M. smithii, along with certain bacteria, is more often found in lean individuals than in those who are overweight. Researchers have sequenced M. smithii genome, indicating that M. smithii may be a therapeutic target for reducing energy harvest in obese humans.

Cell wall and cell membrane compared to bacteria

The cell wall and cell membrane of Methanobrevibacter smithii determine susceptibility to antibiotics and statins. The cell wall is composed of pseudopeptidoglycan (and not peptidoglycan as in bacteria) which makes archaea resistant to lysozyme and many antibiotics that interfere with cell wall synthesis. The cell membrane consists of a lipid bilayer or monolayer, the backbone of which is composed of isoprene units that are linked to glycerol by ether bonds. In contrast, the lipid bilayer of bacteria consists of a fatty acid backbone that is linked to glycerol by an ester bond. The presence of statin-sensitive isoprene units in the cell membrane of archaea allows statins to selectively interfere with the growth of archaea while leaving the cell membrane of bacteria unaffected. While bacteria do not use isoprene units in their cell membrane they are still required elsewhere. These bacterial isoprene units are, however, synthesized by the mevalonate pathway (MEP) that is not inhibited by statins.

In anorexic patients
In 2009, the largest human study concerning obesity and gut microbiota to date was conducted. Obesity disorders are the result of an imbalance and have serious consequences such as cardiovascular disease, type 2 diabetes, and colon cancer. The gut microbiota and environment contributes to the energy imbalance because of its involvement in energy intake, conversion and storage. Culture-independent methods have shown that high proportions of methanogens can comprise up to 10% of all anaerobes in the colons of healthy adults. The quantification average of M. smithii for the anorexic group was much greater than the lean and obese group. Thus, higher amounts of M. smithii were found in anorexic patients than lean patients.

The development of Methanobrevibacter in anorexia patients may be associated with an adaptive attempt towards optimal exploitation of the low caloric diet of anorexic patients. Hence, an increase in M. smithii leads to the optimization of food transformation in low caloric diets. M. smithii could also be related to constipation, a common condition for anorexic patients.

M. smithii and constipation

Observational studies show a strong association between delayed intestinal transit and the production of methane. Experimental data suggest a direct inhibitory activity of methane on the colonic and ileal smooth muscle and a possible role for methane as a gasotransmitter. Statins can inhibit archaeal cell membrane biosynthesis apparently without affecting bacterial numbers as demonstrated in livestock and humans. This opens the possibility of a therapeutic intervention that targets a specific etiological factor of constipation while protecting the intestinal microbiome. While it is generally believed that statins inhibit methane production via their effect on cell membrane biosynthesis, mediated by inhibition of the HMG-CoA reductase, there is accumulating evidence for an alternative or additional mechanism of action where statins inhibit methanogenesis directly. It appears that this other mechanism may predominate when the lactone form of statins, particularly lovastatin, is administered.

References

Further reading

External links
 Paul B. Eckburg, Paul W. Lepp, and David A. Relman Archaea and Their Potential Role in Human Disease
 
 Methanogens Photo Gallery—Methanobrevibacter smithii
 LSPN page for Methanobrevibacter
 
 
 
Type strain of Methanobrevibacter smithii at BacDive -  the Bacterial Diversity Metadatabase
Methanobrevibacter - What we know about the most abundant archaea in the human gut

Euryarchaeota
Archaea described in 1981